is a Japanese former football player. He last plays and manager for FC Tiamo Hirakata.

Playing career
Takeda was born in Kobe on November 30, 1983. After graduating from high school, he joined J2 League club Mito HollyHock in 2002. He could not play many matches behind Koji Homma until 2005. In 2006, he played many matches instead Homma was injured. However he could not become a regular goalkeeper. In 2008, he moved to Japan Football League club Tochigi SC. Although he could not play at all in the match, Tochigi was promoted to J2 end of 2008 season. His opportunity to play increased from 2010. In 2013, he moved to J2 club Giravanz Kitakyushu and played many matches as regular goalkeeper. In 2014, he moved to J1 League club Cerezo Osaka. 

However he could hardly play in the match behind Kim Jin-hyeon. Cerezo was also relegated to J2 end of 2014 season. In 2017, he moved to J2 club Tokyo Verdy. However he could not play at all in the match in 2 seasons. In 2019, he moved to Regional Leagues club FC Tiamo Hirakata.

Managerial career
In 2022, Takeda appointment manager of JFL club, Tiamo Hirakata from September at same year until he left after end of 2022 season.

Career statistics
.

References

External links

Profile at Cerezo Osaka

1983 births
Living people
Association football people from Hyōgo Prefecture
Japanese footballers
J1 League players
J2 League players
J3 League players
Japan Football League players
Mito HollyHock players
Tochigi SC players
Giravanz Kitakyushu players
Cerezo Osaka players
Cerezo Osaka U-23 players
Tokyo Verdy players
FC Tiamo Hirakata players
Association football goalkeepers